Wirenia is a genus of pholidoskepian solenogasters, shell-less, worm-like,  marine  mollusks.

References

Pholidoskepia